Oates is an unincorporated community in northern Reynolds County, in the U.S. state of Missouri. The community is located on Brushy Creek st the intersection of Missouri Route J and county road 836. Nearby communities include Black, approximately seven miles to the east-southeast on the Middle Fork of the Black River and Buick, about six miles to the northwest in Iron County.

History
A post office called Oates was established in 1887, and remained in operation until 1920. The namesake of Oates is unknown.

References

Unincorporated communities in Reynolds County, Missouri
Unincorporated communities in Missouri